Vesta is an unincorporated community in Johnson County, Nebraska, United States.

History
A schoolteacher named Vesta after a former student in Massachusetts.

References

Unincorporated communities in Johnson County, Nebraska
Unincorporated communities in Nebraska